Fermi is a Turin Metro station, located in the Turin suburb of Collegno, near the intersection between Via Edmondo De Amicis and Via Enrico Fermi. Being the westerly terminus of Line 1, there is an adjacent park and ride lot with more than 300 spaces and connecting bus service from Rivoli. The station was opened on 4 February 2006 as the western terminus of the inaugural section of Turin Metro, between Fermi and XVIII Dicembre.

Services
 Parking lot with more than 300 spaces
 Ticket vending machines
 Handicap accessibility
 Elevators
 Escalators
 Active CCTV surveillance

References

Turin Metro stations
Railway stations opened in 2006
2006 establishments in Italy
Collegno
Railway stations in Italy opened in the 21st century